Ammer may refer to:

Amper, or called Ammer, is a river in Bavaria.
Ammer (Neckar), a small river in Baden-Württemberg, Germany, tributary of the Neckar
The upper course of the river Amper in Bavaria, Germany
Thomas Ammer (born 1937), German historian, imprisonment in 1958 for Anti-government political activism in East Germany
Stefan Ammer (born 1942), German-Australian pianist, lecturer, teacher and professor of music

Surnames from nicknames